Alessandra Watle Mele (born 5 September 2002), known mononymously as Alessandra, is a Norwegian-Italian singer and songwriter. She is set to represent Norway in the Eurovision Song Contest 2023 with the song "Queen of Kings".

Early life and education 
Mele was born on 5 September 2002 in Pietra Ligure, Savona to an Italian father from Albenga and a Norwegian mother from Stathelle, and grew up in Cisano sul Neva. At the age of twelve, she won the fifth edition of VB Factor, a local talent show in the Val Bormida region. After graduating from high school in 2021, she first moved in with her maternal grandparents in Porsgrunn, Norway, before moving to Lillehammer, to study at the Lillehammer Institute of Music Production and Industries (LIMPI).

Career

2022: The Voice Norway 
After her Blind Audition, she joined the team of coach Espen Lind. She was eliminated in the live shows.

2023:  and Eurovision Song Contest 
She performed her entry "Queen of Kings" in the first semi-final on 14 January 2023, and was among the three acts to qualify for the final on 4 February 2023. She went on to win the competition, receiving the most points from both the public and the international jury, thereby winning the right to represent Norway at the Eurovision Song Contest 2023 in Liverpool, United Kingdom. She is set to perform in the first semi-final on 9 May 2023.

Personal life 
In an interview with Eurovision Fun, Mele reported that she is bisexual, with her song "Queen of Kings" representing her experiences as a bisexual woman.

Discography

Singles

References 

Living people
2002 births
21st-century Italian women singers
21st-century Norwegian women singers
Bisexual singers
English-language singers from Italy
English-language singers from Norway
Eurovision Song Contest entrants for Norway
Eurovision Song Contest entrants of 2023
Italian emigrants to Norway
Italian LGBT singers
Italian bisexual people
Italian people of Norwegian descent
Melodi Grand Prix winners
Norwegian LGBT singers
Norwegian bisexual people
Norwegian people of Italian descent
People from the Province of Savona
The Voice (franchise) contestants